Paul George Speare (born 10 December 1955) is an English freelance saxophonist and flute player, formerly a member of Dexys Midnight Runners and The TKO Horns.

He was born to Reginald and Julia Speare in Romford, Essex. He attended Dagenham County High School where he began playing drums, piano and viola when he was 15 years of age.  At 16 he took up the flute, and tenor saxophone soon followed. He went on to study flute at the London College of Music and played saxophone in various pop and jazz bands during this time.  Later, he moved to Birmingham and became heavily involved in the Midlands music scene for many years as a session musician, band leader and music producer.

Speare has played in many bands over the years, and from 1981-1982 was a full-time member of Dexys Midnight Runners.  He later formed a horn section called The TKO Horns, along with Jim Paterson and Brian Maurice from Dexys.  Another former Dexys saxophone player Geoff Blythe soon replaced Brian and Dave Plews was added on trumpet.  The TKOs featured prominently on Elvis Costello's 1983 album Punch The Clock. It was during a recording session for Chris Difford and Glenn Tilbrook's album, Difford & Tilbrook, that he was unexpectedly asked by producer Tony Visconti to add a baritone saxophone part to "Actions Speak Faster".  From that moment he discovered his love of the instrument and has specialised in it since.  Speare later featured on the single "Nelson Mandela" by the Special AKA.

From the early 1990s, Speare was a music and media lecturer in a number of further education colleges until 2005.  Since then he has worked as a freelance arranger, session musician and producer. 

He played baritone sax/flute on the tracks "More" and "Old Father Tyme" for the Paul Weller album "On Sunset" (2020).  He featured on the Stone Foundation albums "Street Rituals" (2017) produced by Paul Weller, "Everybody, Anyone" (2018) and "Is Love Enough" (2020), on which he played baritone/tenor sax and flute. He also featured on their live album/DVD Live Rituals (2017), recorded at the Islington Assembly Rooms, with Paul Weller as special guest.

Dexys
In 1981, Speare joined Dexys Midnight Runners.  He featured on the singles "Plan B", "Show Me", "Liars A to E", "Celtic Soul Brothers" and their worldwide hit "Come On Eileen".  He also featured on their album Too-Rye-Ay.

References

1955 births
Living people
British male saxophonists
Dexys Midnight Runners members
English rock saxophonists
People from Romford
21st-century British male musicians
21st-century saxophonists